In astrogeology, an arachnoid  is a large geological structure resembling a spider web. They are of unknown origin, and have been found only on the surface of the planet Venus. They appear as concentric ovals surrounded by a complex network of fractures, and can span 200 kilometers. Over 90 arachnoids have been identified on Venus.

Arachnoids could be related to volcanos, however it is also possible that different arachnoids are formed by different processes. One possible explanation is that an upwelling of magma from the interior of the planet pushed up on the surface, causing cracks. An alternate theory concerning their origin is that they are a precursor to coronae formation.

Much of what is known about arachnoids is the result of studies performed by C.B. Dawson and L.S. Crumpler.

See also 
 Chaos terrain
 Geysers on Mars
 Pancake dome
 Rille
 Coronae

References

External links
 

This article incorporates text from a public-domain NASA website.

Surface features of Venus
Geology of Venus
Planetary geology